Nuphar japonica, known as East Asian yellow water-lily, is an aquatic plant species in the genus Nuphar found in Japan and the Korean Peninsula. It is endangered in Russia. The species was not accepted by The Plant List , which regarded it as an "unresolved name".

Nuphar × saijoensis (Shimoda) Padgett is a hybrid between N. japonica and N. pumila.

N. japonica contains the alkaloids nupharidin, 1-desoxynupharidin, nupharamine, methyl and ethyl esters of nupharamine. The fruits also contains the alkaloids (0.06%) nupharine, beta-nupharidin, desoxynupharidin. In the rhizomes are found the steroid sitosterol, alkaloids acids, higher fatty acids (palmitic, oleic acid) and the ellagitanins nupharin A, B, C, D, E and F.

See also 
 List of freshwater aquarium plant species
 List of the vascular plants in the Red Data Book of Russia

References

External links 

Nymphaeaceae
Plants described in 1821
Flora of Japan
Flora of Korea
Flora of Russia